The 1991–92 season was the 94th season of competitive football played by Arsenal.

Season summary
The club, managed by George Graham, entered the season as Football League First Division champions, with only one defeat in the previous campaign. In spite of scoring the most goals in the division, Arsenal ended the season in fourth position, ten points behind league champions Leeds United. The club exited the FA Cup after defeat by Fourth Division opponents Wrexham and fell at the same stage of the Football League Cup to fellow First Division club Coventry City. Arsenal represented England in the European Cup; the club was the first to do so since the ban on English teams from playing in European club competitions. Their time in the competition was brief however as Portuguese team Benfica eliminated them in the second round.

Arsenal signed striker Ian Wright for a club record fee of £2.5 million in September 1991. Defender Pål Lydersen and midfielder Jimmy Carter later joined the club. Stuart Young moved to Hull City, whereas Michael Thomas joined Liverpool.

After undertaking a series of friendlies, Arsenal played Tottenham Hotspur in the Charity Shield and drew 0–0 to share the honour. Defeats by Everton and Aston Villa set the tone for the league season as the team were left with much to do; a poor run of form during the Christmas and New Year period effectively ruled the team out of retaining the championship. Arsenal finished the season strongly however – unbeaten in 16 matches, to end the campaign in fourth place. Wright was Arsenal's top goalscorer with 26 goals.

Background

Arsenal's failure to retain the league championship in the 1989–90 season prompted manager George Graham to make changes to improve his side; he signed goalkeeper David Seaman and Swedish winger Anders Limpar in the close season. Arsenal made a good start to the league campaign, but had two points deducted in October 1990, after ten of their players were involved in a brawl with Manchester United players, in a match at Old Trafford. In December, captain Tony Adams was sentenced to four months' imprisonment for drink driving. Despite these setbacks, Arsenal lost only one league match all season (away to Chelsea) and finished on 83 points, seven ahead of runners-up Liverpool. They also reached the FA Cup semi-finals, where they faced Tottenham Hotspur. Midfielder Paul Gascoigne scored from a free kick after just five minutes and Tottenham went on to win 3–1, ending hopes of a second Double. Nevertheless, the impressive league form prompted Manchester United manager Alex Ferguson to comment that Arsenal had the platform to "do really well next season", particularly in Europe.

It was the last season that Arsenal played in front of their famous North Bank terrace, which was being demolished over the summer of 1992 to make way for a new all-seater stand which was scheduled for completion during 1993, by which time Highbury was set to have an all-seater capacity of just under 40,000. These changes were necessary due to the Taylor Report, which required all clubs in the highest two divisions of English football to have an all-seater stadium by August 1994.

Transfers
Striker Ian Wright moved from Crystal Palace to Arsenal a month into the season; at £2.5 million he became the club's most expensive signing yet. Palace chairman Ron Noades revealed the club had offered the player a new deal, but "Ian was hankering for a move. He wanted to play in Europe and Arsenal was the club he wanted to join." Arsenal paid £500,000 each for midfielder Jimmy Carter and Pål Lydersen, a Norwegian defender. Graham and Lydersen were in attendance for Norway's international match against the Soviet Union in September 1991; he later agreed personal terms to join Arsenal. In December 1991, Michael Thomas left Arsenal and moved to Liverpool, the club he famously scored against to win the league title for Arsenal in 1989.

In

Out

Loan out

Pre-season and friendlies
In preparation for the forthcoming season, Arsenal played a series of friendlies. The tour of Sweden was a success, with three wins in the space of a week. Arsenal then travelled back to England and beat Plymouth Argyle, before hosting Celtic, Panathinaikos and Sampdoria at Highbury. Arsenal ended their pre-season with a 3–1 victory against Watford, who staged their centenary match. Three further friendlies were played in 1992, one of which was a testimonial for Barry Fry, the manager of Barnet.

Colour key: Green = Arsenal win; Yellow = draw; Red = opponents win. Arsenal score ordered first. Source:

FA Charity Shield

As league champions, Arsenal contested the 1991 FA Charity Shield against local rivals Tottenham Hotspur, who had beaten Nottingham Forest to win the 1991 FA Cup Final. Anders Limpar was absent for Arsenal, as he had sustained a knee injury while on duty for Sweden. David O'Leary started in place of the injured Steve Bould and midfielder David Hillier was picked ahead of Michael Thomas in midfield. In spite of dominating territorial advantage, Arsenal were held to a 0–0 draw, meaning each team held the trophy for six months. Graham commentated that Arsenal played below their usual standard and accepted that his team needed to work on their finishing, in order to make use of their possession.

Football League First Division

A total of 22 teams competed in the First Division in the 1991–92 season. Each team played 42 matches; two against every other team and one match at each club's stadium. Three points were awarded for each win, one point per draw, and none for defeats. This was Arsenal's final season in the Football League; in 1992 they and 21 other clubs joined the newly formed Premier League, which became the top division of English football from the 1992–93 season onwards.

August–October
Arsenal started their defence of the league championship at home to Queens Park Rangers on 17 August 1991. It was the visitors who had led the match right from the 15th minute, but for Arsenal midfielder Paul Merson to earn his side a point after equalising well into stoppage time. The draw according to The Independent showcased the need for reinforcements: "... not just to improve the squad, but also to cause a buzz in the dressing room". Arsenal were beaten 3–1 by Everton at Goodison Park three days after and lost to Aston Villa by the same scoreline. Graham dismissed any talk of crisis, saying "I have been in football too long to think it is going to be nice and comfortable every season" and felt the performance at Villa showed signs of improvement compared to the earlier league fixtures. A 2–0 win at home to Luton Town was followed by victory against Manchester City, where Alan Smith and Limpar scored a goal apiece.

September began with a trip to Elland Road to face Leeds United. Arsenal's two-goal lead was overturned by the opposition, who secured a draw after Lee Chapman equalised in injury time. Had this been the winning goal, "it would have been a gross injustice for Arsenal" opined John Roberts of The Independent. Lee Dixon scored an "amazing" own goal against Coventry City on 7 September 1991, which set Arsenal on their way to their third defeat of the season. The team responded by defeating Crystal Palace 4–1; Kevin Campbell scored his first two goals of the league season. Arsenal scored four first half goals against Sheffield United on 21 September 1991 – the game ended 5–2, which moved them into seventh position – three places up from the previous weekend. By the time Campbell scored Arsenal's fourth "... the North Bank was entitled to sound the ironic chant, 'Boring, boring, Arsenal'," said reporter Jasper Rees. Wright scored three league goals for Arsenal on his league debut, away to Southampton.

Arsenal defeated Chelsea at home in the first weekend of October. The team found themselves two goals down after 20 minutes, but a converted Dixon penalty and goals from Wright and Campbell turned the score around in their favour. Arsenal came away from Old Trafford with a point against league leaders Manchester United on 19 October 1991. After a midweek European football match, Arsenal beat Notts County by two goals, a result which moved them fourth in the table.

November–February

The visit of West Ham United to Highbury produced a 1–0 defeat for Arsenal; the winning goal scored by Mike Small came in the 76th minute. Arsenal's conserved performance was attributed to their upcoming European Cup match, something Graham categorically denied: "I'm not even thinking about next Wednesday." Arsenal drew away to Oldham Athletic and then Sheffield Wednesday, extending a winless run of five games in all competitions. The team beat Tottenham on 1 December 1991 to go fourth in the league table, 10 points behind the leaders. Arsenal's aspiration to defend the league title suffered to Nottingham Forest; though the team scored twice in the second half they were unable to overturn the home side's three-goal lead and collected no points. David Hillier opined that his team "should have done better in the first half – that's when we really lost it." Wright scored all of Arsenal's four goals against Everton, but scored none in the team's Boxing Day defeat by Luton Town. Graham called it Arsenal's worst performance of the season and was critical of his players' attitude. Although the team's concentration and effort improved according to Peter Ball of The Times in their next game – away to Manchester City, Arsenal lost for the second consecutive league match. They ended the calendar year in seventh position, 16 points behind the leaders Manchester United.

January saw Arsenal's title challenge falter; the team went on a four-match winless run. At home, they only merited draws to Wimbledon, Aston Villa and QPR – the latter two were scoreless. Arsenal were beaten 2–0 by Liverpool on 29 January 1992; journalist Derek Hodgson said this was in spite of playing "crisper" and more confident football. A draw against Manchester United on 1 February 1992 came before a win away to Notts County. A crowd of 22,352 witnessed Arsenal draw once more at home, this time against Norwich City. Rockets were launched on the pitch during the match by Arsenal supporters, in protest of the club's bond scheme. Arsenal recorded their biggest win of the season, scoring seven past Sheffield Wednesday, on 15 February 1992. Campbell, who began the match as a substitute, came on and scored two goals; six of Arsenal's goals came in the second half. Arsenal ended February with a 1–1 draw away to Tottenham. After 30 games, the team were in sixth position, 18 points behind Manchester United in first.

March–May
After a fortnight of inactivity in all competitions Arsenal faced Oldham Athletic at Highbury. The team won 2–1 on a day where O'Leary registered his 700th league appearance. Wright scored both of Arsenal's goals against West Ham on 14 March 1992, which inflicted a fifth consecutive league defeat on his opponents. Merson's late equaliser against Leeds United the following week earned Arsenal a point. Against Wimbledon Ray Parlour scored inside the first minute, which set Arsenal on to a 3–1 victory. The third win in four league matches moved Arsenal to fifth position and left journalist Ball to opine: "How the champions must be regretting earlier inconsistency." March ended with a "highly entertaining game" so said match reporter Dennis Signy between Arsenal and Nottingham Forest at Highbury. Arsenal took the lead after five minutes when Dixon converted a penalty kick – it was awarded after Ian Woan was adjudged to have fouled Limpar in the 18-yard box. Forest equalised in the 41st minute, and made it 2–1 moments before the interval. They extend their lead through Roy Keane in the 71st minute, but Arsenal scored twice in the final five minutes to draw.

A 1–0 victory against Coventry City meant Arsenal were five points behind Sheffield Wednesday, who lay in third spot. Arsenal continued their strong finish to the season by scoring seven goals in the space of three days – three away to Norwich City and four at home to Crystal Palace. The team, without the suspended Wright for the trip to Sheffield United came away from Bramall Lane with a point. Arsenal beat Liverpool 4–0 on 21 April 1992, which marked the opposition's biggest defeat in nine years. A draw at Chelsea ended Arsenal's chances of finishing in a UEFA Cup place. Arsenal ended the league campaign with a 5–1 win against Southampton at home. Wright overtook Tottenham striker Gary Lineker as the league's top goalscorer by scoring three on the day which took his total to 29 (24 of those scored for Arsenal) – one more than Lineker.

Results

Colour key: Green = Arsenal win; Yellow = draw; Red = opponents win. Arsenal score ordered first.

Classification

Results summary

League position

FA Cup

Arsenal entered the FA Cup in the third round (last 64), in which they were drawn to face Wrexham of the Football League Fourth Division away from home. Smith's goal had given Arsenal the lead just before half time, but Wrexham equalised through a Mickey Thomas free kick with eight minutes of the match remaining. Steve Watkin scored the winning goal two minutes after, once Adams failed to clear the ball in the penalty box. The cup exit did not prompt Graham to criticise his players; he bluntly said: "I thought they played very well. We just didn't finish them off."

The result was described by BBC Sport in 2011 as "one of the greatest FA Cup giant-killings of all time".

Colour key: Green = Arsenal win; Yellow = draw; Red = opponents win. Arsenal score ordered first.

Football League Cup

Arsenal entered the Football League Cup in the second round, where they were drawn against Leicester City in a two-legged tie. The first match ended 1–1; Wright scored 44 minutes into his debut. Wright and Merson each scored for Arsenal in the second leg which ensured progress into the third round. It was there the team exited the competition following a 1–0 defeat, away to Coventry City.

Colour key: Green = Arsenal win; Yellow = draw; Red = opponents win. Arsenal score ordered first.

European Cup

As league champions, Arsenal participated in the European Cup, where they were drawn to face Austria Wien in the first round. This marked the first time that England was represented in Europe's premier competition since the Heysel disaster in 1985. In the first leg, Arsenal were awarded a penalty after 24 minutes, which Dixon missed. Linighan opened the scoring seven minutes before the interval, when goalkeeper Iliya Valov failed to deal with a cross. Smith then scored four goals for the team in the space of 16 minutes – "The England striker responded resoundingly to Graham Taylor's criticism of his ineffective performance against Germany a week earlier," said The Guardian correspondent David Lacey. Andreas Ogris reduced Arsenal's lead, before Limpar added a sixth, taking the ball on unchallenged and shooting from a narrow angle. Arsenal lost the second leg 1–0 at the Franz Horr Stadium on 2 October 1991, but progressed as they won 6–2 on aggregate.

In spite of earning a draw against Benfica away from home the following round, first leg, Arsenal were eliminated from the tournament, in extra time at home on 6 November 1991. Graham offered no complaints in witnessing his side going out, by saying: "Benfica played very well once we went 1–0 up. Their attack was superb. We could have done with more anticipation in the box."

Colour key: Green = Arsenal win; Yellow = draw; Red = opponents win. Arsenal score ordered first.

Squad statistics
Arsenal used a total of 24 players during the 1991–92 season and there were 16 different goalscorers. There were also two squad members who did not make a first-team appearance in the campaign. Merson featured in 50 matches – the most of any Arsenal outfield player in the campaign. Seaman started in all 42 league matches. The team scored a total of 92 goals in all competitions. The top goalscorer was Wright, with 26 goals – 24 of which were scored in the league.

Key

No. = Squad number

Pos = Playing position

Nat. = Nationality

Apps = Appearances

GK = Goalkeeper

DF = Defender

MF = Midfielder

FW = Forward

Numbers in parentheses denote appearances as substitute. Players with name struck through and marked  left the club during the playing season.

Source:

See also

 1991–92 in English football
 List of Arsenal F.C. seasons

References

External links
 125 years of Arsenal history – 1991–1995 on Arsenal.com

Arsenal
Arsenal F.C. seasons